Federal Route 60 is a federal road in Perak, Malaysia. The road connects Changkat Jering in the north to Kampung Koh in the south. The roads also a main route to North–South Expressway Northern Route via Changkat Jering Interchange.

Route background
The Kilometre Zero of the Federal Route 60 starts at Simpang Changkat Jering, at its interchange with the Federal Route 1, the main trunk road of the central of Peninsular Malaysia.

History
After the completion of Dinding Bypass (including Raja Pemaisuri Bainun Bridge) and Sitiawan Bypass. The Federal Route 60 then extended towards south and passing a major towns such as Sitiawan, Seri Manjung and then finally Kampung Koh where its interchange with the Federal Route 5, the main trunk road of the west coast of Peninsular Malaysia.

Features
There are two highway bypass of the Federal Route 60 including:
 Dinding Bypass
 Sitiawan Bypass

At most sections, the Federal Route 60 is windy with many sharp curves, allowing maximum speed limit of up to 70 km/h.

There are no overlaps, alternate routes, or sections with motorcycle lanes.

List of junctions and towns

References

 Source: Malaysia Road Atlas, World Express Mapping

Malaysian Federal Roads